Mark McGuire may refer to:

A misspelling of Mark McGwire
Mark McGuire (musician) (born 1986), American musician